The 1953 Philadelphia Eagles season was their 21st in the league. The team improved on their previous output of 7–5, going 7–4–1. The team failed to qualify for the playoffs for the fourth consecutive season.

Off Season

At the end of the 1952 season, 2-year player Bud Grant is offered a pay raise in his contract. He chooses to play football in the CFL(Canadian Football League) instead. He would have a career worthy of being named to the CFL's Hall of Fame as a player. Later on he would make the Pro Football Hall of Fame as coach of the Minnesota Vikings.

The Eagles held training camp at Hershey Park Stadium in Hershey, PA for the 3rd strait year.

Matt Guokas, Sr. is hired to be the PA announcer for the Eagles. Guokas played basketball for Saint Joseph's Hawks in college and the Philadelphia Warriors in the NBA.  After losing his right leg in an automobile accident, Guokas turned to broadcasting, and he served as an announcer for the N Philadelphia Eagles for 32 years from 1953 to 1985.

NFL Draft
The 1953 NFL Draft was held on January 22, 1953. There was 30 rounds in the draft with 12 teams picking. The San Francisco 49ers received this year's Lottery bonus pick. With this pick they chose  Harry Babcock an End out of University of Georgia.

The 1952 expansion team Dallas Texans (NFL) folded during the 1952 season and then became the Baltimore Colts on January 23, 1953. The Colts had the number 1 pick and choose Heisman Trophy winner Billy Vessels a Halfback out of University of Oklahoma.

With a 7–5 record in 1952  the Eagles got the 7th, 8th or 9th pick in the 30 rounds. With trading away their 1st round pick the Eagles 1st selection was the 7th pick in the 2nd round, 20th overall, they chose Al Conway a Back out of Army and William Jewell College. He  did not play due to injury and ended up as an official in the American Football League and an official in the NFL for 28 years.

Player selections
The table shows the Eagles selections and what picks they had that were traded away and the team that ended up with that pick. It is possible the Eagles' pick ended up with this team via another team that the Eagles made a trade with.
Not shown are acquired picks that the Eagles traded away.

Schedule

Game recaps

Week 1 @ San Francisco

Week 2 vs Washington
The Eagles inability to hold onto the ball allows the Washington Redskins to tie them at 21 – 21.
The Eagles allowed 4 interceptions and would lose 1 fumble as they allowed Washington to gain 182 yards on 9 completions. The Eagles also hurt their cause by having 10 penalties for 99 yards called against them.

Week 3 @ Cleveland Browns

Week 4 vs Pittsburgh Steelers

Week 5 @ Chicago Cardinals

Week 6 @ Pittsburgh Steelers

Week 7 vs New York Giants

Week 8 vs Baltimore Colts

Week 9 vs Chicago Cardinals

Week 10 @ New York Giants

Week 11 @ Washington Redskins

Week 12 vs Cleveland Browns
The Eagles give the Cleveland Browns their only loss of the regular season in the final week of the season. Cleveland would have 3 turn overs during the game.

Standings

Playoffs
With a record of 7–4–1 the Eagles finish behind Cleveland and fail to make the playoffs. The  Detroit Lions won the National Division and played the Cleveland Browns in the 1953 NFL Championship Game.

Roster
(All time List of Philadelphia Eagles players in franchise history)

 + = Pro Bowl starter

 Jerry Williams will become head coach of Eagles for the 1969 season

Postseason
Philadelphia finished second in last 2 seasons to the Cleveland Browns, with that Trimble is awarded a three-year contract after the team's second straight runnerup finish in 1953.

Awards and honors
Pro Bowl

The Eagles placed 6 players on the 1953 Pro Bowl team. Chuck Bednarik is named MVP of the Pro Bowl.
Chuck Bednarik (Center – Linebacker)
Ken Farragut    (Center – Linebacker)
Bucko Kilroy (Lineman)
Pete Pihos (End)
Lum Snyder  (Tackle) 
Bobby Thomason (Quarterback)

League leaders
Bobby Thomason finished 2nd in passing attempts and passing yards to George Blanda
Bobby Thomason finished 3rd in pass completions
Pete Pihos leads league in receptions, receiving yards and receiving TDs
Chuck Bednarik ties for lead in interceptions returned for TD

References

Philadelphia Eagles seasons
Philadelphia Eagles
Philadelphia Eagles